Maria Luisa of Parma (Luisa Maria Teresa Anna; 9 December 1751 – 2 January 1819) was, by marriage to King Charles IV of Spain, Queen of Spain from 1788 to 1808 leading up to the Peninsular War. Her relationship with Manuel Godoy and influence over the King made her unpopular among the people and aristocrats. She was rivals with the Duchess of Alba and the Duchess of Osuna, attracting popular attention. The death of her daughter-in-law Princess Maria Antonia of Naples and Sicily, whom she disliked, was said to be the poisoning by the Queen.

Life

Early life
She was the youngest daughter of Philip, Duke of Parma, the fourth son of Philip V of Spain, and Louise Élisabeth of France, the eldest daughter of King Louis XV. Born in Parma, she was christened Luisa María Teresa Ana after her maternal grandparents and her mother's favourite sister Anne Henriette of France, but is known to history by the short Spanish form of this name: María Luisa, while Luisa was the name she used in private.  

Her parents had been the Duke and Duchess of Parma since 1749, when the Treaty of Aix-la-Chapelle (1748) awarded the duchy to the Bourbons. 

Maria Luisa, her brother Ferdinand and her sister Isabella are traditionally said to have been educated by Étienne Bonnot de Condillac, a well-known French philosopher. However, Condillac did in fact not arrive in Parma until 1768.

Maria Luisa was not considered as beautiful as her elder sister, but was still described as attractive, though she was quite short.

Princess of Asturias

María Luisa's mother tried to engage her to Louis, Duke of Burgundy, heir to the French throne. However, the young duke died in 1761. In 1762, Maria Luisa instead became engaged to her cousin Charles, Prince of Asturias, later King Charles IV of Spain. When her elder sister Isabella died in 1763, there were suggestions that Maria Luisa marry her sister's widower, Emperor Joseph II, but the proposal was refused and her engagement to Charles of Asturias was confirmed. The wedding took place on 4 September 1765 in La Granja Palace.

Her husband was the son and heir of the widowed Charles III of Spain, previously Duke of Parma and King of Naples and Sicily. This formally gave her the position of princess of Asturias, or crown princess. However, as there was no queen in Spain at that time, María Luisa became the first lady in precedence at the court almost from the beginning of her residence there, after the Queen Mother and former Royal Regent, Queen Isabel de Farnesio, died a few months later.  

Maria Luisa was described as intelligent, ambitious and dominant. Regarding her appearance, she was considered to be pretty at the time of her wedding. She was known for her elegance and extravagance in fashion and jewelry. However, already by the age of thirty, she was reportedly prematurely aged and described by the Russian ambassador Zinoviev: "Repeated childbirths, indispositions and maybe some inheritable diseases has caused her to wither entirely; the yellow tone of her skin and the loss of her teeth was the final death blow to her beauty."
Her father-in-law Charles III viewed her to be frivolous and attempted to control and supervise her private life and restrict her personal freedom, but with little success. 

Her relationship to Charles was described as a good one, but she reportedly dominated him early on. Her father-in-law took care to remove both Charles and Maria Luisa from interfering in state affairs; however, while her husband was of a passive character and devoted to his interests in hunt and mechanics, Maria Luisa was interested in state affairs and, being the dominant partner of the two, became the leading figure in the circle of opposition which gathered around the heir to the throne.

Queen of Spain

In 1788, her spouse succeeded his father as Charles IV of Spain, making Maria Luisa queen. On the first meeting between Charles IV and his ministers, Maria Luisa was present, a step which attracted attention and which became the rule during the reign of her spouse. Being the dominant party in the marriage, Maria Luisa dominated Charles IV and thus the government, but was in turn reputed to be dominated by prime minister Manuel de Godoy. 

María Luisa was notoriously reputed to have had many love affairs. The most infamous of them was with the prime minister Manuel de Godoy, whom contemporary gossip singled out in particular as a long-time lover; in 1784 a member of the guard, he was promoted through several ranks when Charles and Maria Luisa succeeded to the throne, and was appointed prime minister in 1792. Godoy was also rumored to be the natural father of several of her children. In 1791, minister Floridablanca accused Godoy for being the lover of the Queen, which resulted in Floridablanca losing his office. Several other men beside Godoy have been pointed out as her lovers, among them her courtier Mallo.  

Several contemporaries, such as the foreign ambassadors, among them the French ambassador Alquier, reported about these rumors, also in the diplomatic correspondence of the time. The truth of them is however questioned, and some issues may have been fabricated or exaggerated for political reasons by the royal court as well as by foreign powers. There is no direct evidence that she had any lovers.     The Queen's confessor Fray Juan Almaraz wrote in his last will that she admitted in articulo mortis that "none, none of her sons and daughters, none was of the legitimate marriage". The veracity of that testimony, however, remains disputed. King Charles IV never expressed any suspicions or doubt about the queen's fidelity. There is no doubt that Maria Luisa and Godoy had a close relationship regardless of the nature of it, as their correspondence illustrates that she spoke to him of such intimate matters as the discontinuation of her menstruation and the depression caused by her menopause, and was given comfort by him and assured that she would find her new state in life fulfilling as well. Aside from her purported affairs, there where several other well known rumors circulating about her. The rivalry between the Queen and the duchess of Osuna, and the duchess of Alba, attracted attention, and when the duchess of Alba died in 1802, she was rumored to have been poisoned by the queen. In 1802 her son married Princess Maria Antonia of Naples and Sicily. When Princess Maria Antonia died in 1806, she was rumored to have been poisoned by the queen also. 

Maria Luisa was interested in music and art, and known as a protector of artists, most notably Francisco Goya. 

The Queen's purported relationship with prime minister Godoy in combination with her reputed political influence exposed her to the public's discontent over Godoy's Treaty with Napoleonic France, in which French troops were stationed in Spain, and in one incident, the Queen was threatened by a mob and had to be protected by her life guard. In 1808, the popular discontent over the policy against France resulted in an uprising in Aranjuez.

Later life

On 19 March 1808, Charles IV abdicated the throne in favor of his son Ferdinand VII due to pressure from Napoleon I. In April 1808, Maria Luisa accompanied Charles IV and Manuel Godoy to a meeting with Napoleon in Bayonne in France to persuade the emperor to intercede and assist her husband in reclaiming the Spanish throne from their son. Their son Ferdinand VII also attended the meeting. At the meeting, however, Napoleon forced both Charles IV and Ferdinand VII to renounce their claims to the throne in favor of his brother Joseph Bonaparte and declared the Bourbon dynasty in Spain deposed.  When Napoleon's army invaded Spain, several pamphlets blamed her for the abdication.  

After the forced abdication, Maria Luisa lived with Charles IV and Manuel Godoy as state prisoners of Napoleon in France.  First in Compiègne and Aix-en-Provence, they were allowed to relocate to Marseille, where they lived for four years.  In 1812 they were allowed to settle under the protection of the Pope in the Barberini Palace in Rome.  

After the fall of Napoleon in 1814, her son Ferdinand VII was reinstated upon the Spanish throne. However, he banned his parents as well as Godoy from returning to Spain. During Napoleon's temporary return to power in France during the Hundred Days in 1815, Maria Luisa, Charles and Godoy left for France, 
but after his final fall, they returned to Rome where they settled permanently. 

During their residence in Rome, Maria Luisa and Charles created a large art collection of paintings by artists Titian, Correggio, Leonardo, Lucas Cranach, Andrea del Sarto, Parmigianino, Bronzino, Palma El Viejo, Tintoretto, Veronese, Poussin, Gaspar Dughet, and Alessandro Turchi. This collection was later transferred to Madrid.   

Both María Luisa and her husband died in Italy in early 1819. María Luisa reportedly died of consumption.   

Manuel Godoy was made universal heir in her will, with the statement that he had shared their exile and lost his property for it.

Legacy
In 1792, the Order of Queen Maria Luisa for women was founded on her suggestion.

Portrayal in film

Issue

Maria Luisa married her first cousin Charles IV in 1765. She had 24 pregnancies of which she had 10 miscarriages and 14 children were born, seven of whom survived into adulthood.

In addition, Maria Luisa had ten other pregnancies who ended in miscarriages:

 A miscarriage of a daughter in the 4th month of pregnancy (19 December 1775).
 A miscarriage of a daughter in the 6th month of pregnancy (16 August 1776).
 A miscarriage in the 1st month of pregnancy (22 January 1778).
 A miscarriage of a son in the 4th and a half month of pregnancy (17 January 1781).
 A miscarriage in the 1st month of pregnancy (4 December 1789).
 A miscarriage in the 1st month of pregnancy (30 January 1790).
 A miscarriage in the 1st month of pregnancy (30 March 1790).
 A miscarriage of a son in the 5th and a half month of pregnancy (11 January 1793).
 A miscarriage of a son in the 4th and a half month of pregnancy (20 March 1796).
 A miscarriage in 1799.

Ancestry

Notes

Bibliography

 EPTON, Nina, The Spanish mousetrap: Napoleon and the Court of Spain (London: Macdonald, 1973).
 HILT, Douglas, The troubled trinity: Godoy and the Spanish monarchs (Tuscaloosa; London: University of Alabama Press, 1987).
 HUGUES, Robert, Goya (London: Harvill Press, 2003).
 Ursula Tamussino: Isabella von Parma. Gemahlin Josephs II. ÖBV, Wien 1989, .
 Kendall W. Brown: Maria Luisa Teresa of Parma. In: Anne Commire (Hrsg.): Women in World History, Bd. 10 (2001), S. 330f.
 Marie-Louise-Thérèse de Parma. In: Nouvelle biographie générale. Bd. 33 (1860), Sp. 668f.

|-

Spanish royal consorts
Princesses of Asturias
Dames of the Order of Saint Isabel
Princesses of Bourbon-Parma
Nobility from Parma
1751 births
1819 deaths
Burials in the Pantheon of Kings at El Escorial
Charles IV of Spain
Queen mothers
Women who experienced pregnancy loss
Daughters of monarchs